Ashworth College is a private for-profit online college based in Peachtree Corners, Georgia. It operates subsidiary schools Madison School of Healthcare, PCDI Canada, and James Madison High School.

History

Since its founding in 1987, Professional Career Development Institute (PCDI) has developed a large selection of distance-learning programs for its high school, career, and degree programs.

James Madison High School (JMHS) was established in 1996 to aid students who need an alternative approach to a high school education. JMHS provides the curriculum needed for students to complete one to four years of high school course work that will lead to a high school diploma.

In 2000, PCDI established Ashworth College to offer associate degree programs to students who need an alternative approach to a college education. Ashworth College started offering master’s degree programs in 2004 and bachelor’s degree programs in 2007.

In 2007, all schools under PCDI merged under the Ashworth College umbrella.

In May 2015, the Federal Trade Commission and Ashworth College entered a settlement in which the college agreed to alter its advertising claims. The commission had charged in its complaint that the college had deceptively marketed its online college degree and career-training programs. It stated that some Ashworth programs failed to meet the basic educational requirements set by state licensing boards for careers or jobs such as real estate appraisers, home inspectors, elementary school educators, and massage practitioners. The commission also claimed that the college's credits were represented as fully transferable, although it lacked supporting data that other colleges and universities would accept their credits.

As of 2021, the college is no longer accepting new students for its graduate programs.

Academics

Accreditation and licensing
Ashworth College is accredited by the Distance Education Accrediting Commission. The associate degree in veterinary technician program is accredited by the  American Veterinary Medical Association  (AVMA) Committee on Veterinary Technician Education and Activities (CVTEA). Ashworth College is also authorized by the Georgia Nonpublic Postsecondary Education Commission to offer instruction in career programs, undergraduate certificates, associate degree, bachelor's degree, and master's degree programs.

James Madison High School is regionally accredited by the Cognia.

Ashworth Community
The Ashworth College Community gives students the opportunity to participate in online study groups, clubs and organizations and receive tutorial assistance, career advice and student support. The Ashworth College student body includes students from all 50 states and many countries.

Admissions and financial aid
To be accepted to Ashworth College, students must be at least 16 years old or have an enrollment form filled out by a parent or guardian. College degrees require a high school diploma or a GED to enroll. Ashworth College does not accept or offer federal or financial aid or provide student loans, claiming that this is due to their mission to make the tuition affordable to all.

References

External links
 

Private universities and colleges in Georgia (U.S. state)
Distance education institutions based in the United States
Distance Education Accreditation Commission
For-profit universities and colleges in the United States
Educational institutions established in 1987
1987 establishments in Georgia (U.S. state)